The Temperance Movement is the debut studio album by British rock band The Temperance Movement. The album, which was released on 16 September 2013, was recorded in the space of just four days at the Fish Factory, Willesden, North West London. The album is available on three formats: CD, cassette and vinyl. The standard edition vinyl is black, while there are limited edition white, blue and clear LPs. It was also made available to download via iTunes.

According to guitarist Luke Potashnick, The Temperance Movement "is about friendship, good times and redemption – losing your way, then finding it – over and over." He describes the album as "very song-driven", and he insists that the band had "no commercial agenda" in mind when making the album — they merely wanted "to write and perform good music that was real."

As of January 2016, the album has sold 31,645 copies.

Track listing
All songs written by Phil Campbell, Luke Potashnick and Paul Sayer, except "Midnight Black" and "Lovers and Fighters", written by Phil Campbell.

Sources:

Personnel
The Temperance Movement
 Phil Campbell — vocals
 Luke Potashnick — guitars
 Paul Sayer — guitars
 Nick Fyffe — bass
 Damon Wilson — drums

Production
 The Temperance Movement — production
 Sam Miller — production, recording, mixing
 Christian Wright — mastering

Other
 Russ Gilbert — artwork
 Caroline Perjesi — photography (front cover)
 Dominic Greensmith — photography (back cover)
 Jamie Wagg — photography (inside cover)

Source:

References

2013 debut albums
The Temperance Movement albums
Earache Records albums